Stubby is a nickname for the following people:

 Stubby Clapp (born 1973), minor league baseball hitting coach and player
 Lee Gordon (1902-1946), American jazz musician
 Stubby Greer (1929-1994), American minor league baseball player, coach and manager
 Harold Kruger (1897-1965), American Olympic swimmer, actor and stunt double
 Stubby Magner (1888-1956), American Major League Baseball player in 1911
 Stubby Overmire (1919-1977), American Major League Baseball pitcher
 Irv Ray (1864-1948), American Major League Baseball player
 Stubby Stubblefield (1907-1935), American racecar driver

Lists of people by nickname